Galician Writers Association (AELG) is an official entity of the autonomous region of Galicia's Xunta (government / board). The organization is formed by writers in galician language. It was founded by a group of writers: Álvaro Cunqueiro, Rafael Dieste, Ánxel Fole, Ricardo Carballo Calero, Antón Avilés de Taramancos, and others. It was named by the Swedish Academy to present candidates to the Nobel Prize and is part of the European Writers Congress.

Every year AELG celebrates "O escritor na súa terra" (Hometown Writers) ceremony dedicated to a Galician language writer trajectory and awards the AELG Prize to the best Galician language work of the year.

At present, Galician Writers Association is placed in a A Coruña, presided by Euloxio Ruibal, and also directed by Carlos Negro, Carlos L. Bernárdez, Marica Campo, Rafa Villar, Marta Dacosta, Rosa Aneiros, Enrique Rabuñal and Cesáreo Sánchez.

See also 
 Royal Galician Academy

External links 
 Asociación de Escritores en Língua Galega

Galicia
Organisations based in Galicia, Spain